The YWCA Building, located at 25 West Rayen Avenue in Youngstown, Ohio, is an historic building built in 1911 for members of the Young Women's Christian Association. On July 23, 1986, it was added to the National Register of Historic Places. YWCA Mahoning Valley, formerly known as YWCA Youngstown, occupies the building. YWCA Youngstown merged with YWCA Warren on May 1, 2018, to become YWCA Mahoning Valley. YWCA Mahoning Valley also operates a site at 375 North Park Avenue in Warren, Ohio, as well as scattered-site housing in the greater Youngstown area.

National Register listing
YWCA Building ** (added 1986 - Building - #86001949)
25 W. Rayen Ave., Youngstown
Historic Significance: 	Event, Architecture/Engineering
Architect, builder, or engineer: 	Wade, Angus
Architectural Style: 	Classical Revival
Area of Significance: 	Architecture, Social History
Period of Significance: 	1900-1924
Owner: 	Private
Historic Function: 	Social
Historic Sub-function: 	Civic
Current Function: 	Social
Current Sub-function: 	Civic

History and current use
The building was built in 1911 for members of the YWCA. Like many YWCAs of the time, the Youngstown YWCA provided rooms for single women to rent in addition to providing recreational and social activities. YWCA Mahoning Valley is still actively using this building as its headquarters and administrative offices. Housing is now provided for homeless families as well as homeless women. in 2009 and 2010, YWCA Youngstown (as it was known at the time) received grant money to convert its 36 existing single room units in this building into 30 self-contained efficiency and one-bedroom units.

See also
 List of YWCA buildings
 National Register of Historic Places listings in Ohio

References

External links

 National Register listings for Mahoning County, Ohio
 YWCA Youngstown home page
 YWCA Youngstown facilities
 Ohio Green Communities Grant to YMCA Youngstown

Clubhouses on the National Register of Historic Places in Ohio
National Register of Historic Places in Mahoning County, Ohio
Buildings and structures in Youngstown, Ohio
Women's organizations based in the United States
YWCA buildings
History of women in Ohio